Roberta Alexandra Kerr (born 24 May 1952) is an English actress. She is known for her various roles in British soap operas including Sally Haynes in Brookside, Wendy Crozier in Coronation Street and Jan Glover in Emmerdale, as well as portraying several characters in Doctors.

Life and career
Kerr was born in Southampton, England on 24 May 1952. She began her acting career in 1984 when she joined the Channel 4 soap opera Brookside as Sally Haynes. She portrayed the character on a recurring basis until 1985. The same year, she played another character named Sally in an episode of Travelling Man and in 1986, she played Mrs. Bennett in an episode of the BBC Two drama anthology series Screenplay. In 1988, she made her film debut as Mrs. Dalton in The Nature of the Beast and also appeared in an episode of the mini-series Wipe Out, where she played a civil servant.

In 1989, Kerr joined the cast of the ITV soap opera Coronation Street as Wendy Crozier, a woman who works for the council and embarks on an affair with Ken Barlow (William Roache), which led to his divorce from his wife, Deirdre (Anne Kirkbride). She left the show in May 1990 following the conclusion of the storyline. In July 1994, Kerr portrayed Pam Blake in an episode of the ITV drama series Medics. The following month, she was cast as Jan Glover in Emmerdale, the wife of Ned (Johnny Leeze). During her time on the show, the character's major storylines included coming to terms with the deaths of her children Dave (Ian Kelsey) and Linda (Tonicha Jeronimo), as well as suffering a nervous breakdown and being sectioned. Kerr departed the role after four years in 1998. In 1999, Kerr played Tania Sylvester in an episode of Casualty and in 2000, she portrayed Miss Robinson in the film Seeing Red. In 2005, Kerr appeared in the BBC soap opera Doctors as Margaret Ellen. She went on to return to Doctors on two further occasions, portraying the roles of Sheila Mitchum and Joan Jonson in 2007 and 2020, respectively. Kerr also had minor guest roles in The Royal Today, Silk, Downton Abbey and Hollyoaks.

In 2012, Kerr reprised her role of Wendy Crozier in Coronation Street for a short stint, as part of a storyline where Wendy and Ken are reacquainted again after becoming governors at the same school. The character departed after her advances were rejected by Ken. Ten years later, in 2022, she reprised the role again as a regular character. The return saw Wendy as a foster carer involved in a storyline centred around Abi Franklin (Sally Carman) attempting to gain custody of her son.

Filmography

References

External links
 

1952 births
20th-century English actresses
21st-century English actresses
English film actresses
English soap opera actresses
English television actresses
Living people
Actresses from Southampton